HJ Luus (born ) is a South African rugby union player for the  in the Currie Cup. His regular position is hooker.

Luus was named in the team for the first round of Super Rugby Unlocked against , making his debut in the process.

References

South African rugby union players
1988 births
Living people
Rugby union hookers
Griquas (rugby union) players